Elisabeth Bas (1571, in Kampen – 2 August 1649, in Amsterdam) was a business person in the Dutch Republic.  She was the spouse of Jochem Hendrickszoon Swartenhont.

Biography
Swartenhont was an admiral in the navy of the Dutch Republic and a military hero.  Jochem Swartenhont was painted, wearing his military decorations by Nicolaes Eliasz. Pickenoy (1588-1655) - Pickenoy also painted Joachem's daughter Maria. During his frequent absence, Elisabeth, as was the custom for the wives of sailors, supported herself with small time business such as selling bread. During the Twelve Years' Truce (1609-1621) Jochem was out of work and set up a tavern in Amsterdam named after the Prince of Orange.  It was on the corner of the Nes and the Pieter Jacobszstraat and was patronised by politicians, artists and writers.  After Jochem's death Elisabeth, continued to manage it until at least 1631. She later sold it, becoming rich (she left 28,000 guilders on her death).

Jochem died in 1627, leaving his wife and four children.  Three of these children died before their mother.  The eldest daughter, Maria, had had three children and so these were adopted by Elisabeth on Maria's death - one of them, Maria Rey, later commissioned a portrait of Elisabeth from Dutch painter Ferdinand Bol.

References

Institute of Netherlands History biography.

External links

1571 births
1649 deaths
17th-century Dutch women
People from Kampen, Overijssel
17th-century Dutch businesspeople